is a vertically scrolling shooter game released for arcades by Irem in 1990.

Gameplay

The player selects from a jet fighter or helicopter, shoot enemies in the air and ground, collect power-ups, and defeat bosses to advance levels.

The game differs from most others in the genre in that you can change the aircraft you use at the start of each level. The jet fighter always shoots straight forward; power-ups increase the width and strength of its shots. The helicopter fires thinner and weaker shots, but turns in the direction it moves (similar to the later Zero Gunner), giving it great range; powerups increase the strength of shots, as well as the number of bullets per shot (adding a small "spread" effect to the shot while moving around).

Both the fighter and the helicopter also start with three bombs which wipe out everything in their path, including enemy shots. These bombs are also unique compared to similar games, in that they produce a line of small horizontal blasts that can be "directed" at the line travels across the ground, by pressing left and right (similar to the helicopter's shots). Additional bombs can be picked up during the course of the game.

Losing a life resets your power and bomb count to the amount you start with. "Air Duel" is a challenging game, and later levels can become nearly unplayable if a single life is lost.

Miscellaneous
All of GunForce II's music comes from Air Duel, though not all tracks were used and both games are presumably took place in the same setting. The underwater path of the first mission of Metal Slug 3 features a melody which is a remix of Air Duel's 3rd & 10th stages' theme. All three games are known to have the same composer and likely the same staff.

Reception 
In Japan, Game Machine listed Air Duel on their July 15, 1990 issue as being the fourth most-successful table arcade unit of the month.

References

External links
 Air Duel at Arcade History
 

1990 video games
Arcade video games
Arcade-only video games
Helicopter video games
Irem games
Vertically scrolling shooters
Video games developed in Japan
Video games scored by Takushi Hiyamuta